is a passenger railway station in located in the city of Matsubara,  Osaka Prefecture, Japan, operated by the private railway operator Kintetsu Railway.

Lines
Takaminosato Station is served by the Minami Osaka Line, and is located 9.1 rail kilometers from the starting point of the line at Ōsaka Abenobashi Station.

Station layout
The station consists of two ground-level side platforms connected by an underground passage.

Platforms

Adjacent stations

History
Takaminosato Station opened on September 1, 1932.

Passenger statistics
In fiscal 2018, the station was used by an average of 6,619 passengers daily.

Surrounding area
 Hannan University Senior High School
 Matsubara City Cultural Hall
 Matsubara Library
 Matsubara Municipal Gymnasium

See also
List of railway stations in Japan

References

External links

 Kintetsu: Takaminosato Station 

Railway stations in Japan opened in 1932
Railway stations in Osaka Prefecture
Matsubara, Osaka